Bajpatti Assembly constituency is an assembly constituency in Sitamarhi district in the Indian state of Bihar.

Overview 
As per Delimitation of Parliamentary and Assembly constituencies Order, 2008, 27. Bajpatti Assembly constituency is composed of the following: Bajpatti and Bokhara community development blocks; Birar, Bhadiyan, Janipur, Bahera Jahidpur, Dorpur, Majhaur, Rasulganj Urf Koili, Nanpur Uttari, Nanpur Dakshini, Dadri, Sirsi and Gauri gram panchayats of Nanpur CD Block.

Bajpatti Assembly constituency is part of Sitamarhi (Lok Sabha constituency).

Members of Legislative Assembly

Election results

2020

References

External links
 

Assembly constituencies of Bihar
Politics of Sitamarhi district